Tracy-Anne McPhee is a Canadian politician, who was elected to the Legislative Assembly of Yukon in the 2016 election. She represents the electoral district of Riverdale South as a member of the Yukon Liberal Party.

She is currently the Minister of Education, the Minister of Justice, and the Government House Leader in the Yukon.

Personal life

Prior to entering territorial politics, McPhee worked in law for more than two decades as a practitioner, educator, and consultant, focusing on administrative law, labour law, criminal and regulatory prosecutions, and child protection cases. In 2002, she became the first female President of the Yukon Law Society, a position she held for four terms before becoming the President of the Canadian Federation of Law Societies. She is a recipient of the Canadian Bar Association Award for outstanding service to the association.

McPhee was appointed Yukon Ombudsman and Information and Privacy Commissioner from 2007 to 2012. She also served as the Executive Director of the Kwanlin Dun Cultural Centre in Whitehorse.

She holds a Bachelor of Arts from Dalhousie University (1983), a Bachelor of Education from Saint Mary's University (1984), and an L.L.B. from Dalhousie University Law School (1990).  She was admitted to the Law Society of Upper Canada and the Law Society of Yukon in 1992.

Political career

McPhee was elected as MLA for Riverdale South on November 7, 2016 as part of the Liberal majority government of Sandy Silver. She defeated popular former city councillor and incumbent New Democrat Jan Stick by just 37 votes.

On December 3, 2016, McPhee was appointed Minister of Justice and Minister of Education. She is also the Government House Leader and a member of the Members' Services Board.

McPhee was reelected in the 2021 Yukon general election

On May 3, 2021, McPhee was named Deputy Premier of the Yukon.

On October 27, 2021, all 11 opposition MLAs from the Yukon Party and New Democrats filed a motion calling for the resignation of McPhee as MLA over her handling of a 2019 sexual assault case at a Whitehorse elementary school when she was Education Minister. However, all 7 Liberal MLAs present voted against the motion and to keep McPhee as MLA, and Premier Silver expressed support for her. Because of this, YP leader Currie Dixon has said he could consider a motion of no confidence against Silver.

Electoral record

2016 general election

|-

| Liberal
| Tracy McPhee
| align="right"| 421
| align="right"| 37.2%
| align="right"| +8.9%
|-

| NDP
| Jan Stick
| align="right"| 384
| align="right"| 34.0%
| align="right"| -5.2%

|-
! align=left colspan=3|Total
! align=right| 1128
! align=right| 100.0%
! align=right| –
|}

References

Yukon Liberal Party MLAs
Women MLAs in Yukon
Living people
Politicians from Whitehorse
21st-century Canadian politicians
21st-century Canadian women politicians
Members of the Executive Council of Yukon
Women government ministers of Canada
Year of birth missing (living people)